Anitra Linnéa Steen (born Anitra Linnéa Bergström on 13 May 1949) is a Swedish politician, civil servant and the wife of former Prime Minister Göran Persson.

Between 1999 and May 2009, when she retired, she was the manager of Systembolaget, the Swedish state alcoholic beverage retailing monopoly. In that role she was forced to cope with a full blown corruption scandal, involving bribery of shop managers and senior staff by some major suppliers, including Vin & Sprit, formerly the producing and importing division of the Swedish state monopoly. Vin & Sprit is now owned by Pernod Ricard.

Personal
Steen was born in Västanfors, Fagersta, Västmanland. Since 6 December 2003 she has been married to Göran Persson, former Prime Minister of Sweden. Because of her personal connection to the head of the Swedish government, her independence as a board member of Scandinavian Airlines, which is jointly owned by the Scandinavian governments, has been put in question by some.

References

1949 births
Living people
People from Fagersta Municipality
Spouses of prime ministers of Sweden
Swedish civil servants
Swedish Social Democratic Party politicians
People from Västanfors